South Athens is one of the regional units of Greece. It is part of the region of Attica. The regional unit covers the south-central part of the agglomeration of Athens.

Administration

As a part of the 2011 Kallikratis government reform, the regional unit South Athens was created out of part of the former Athens Prefecture. It is subdivided into 8 municipalities. These are (number as in the map in the infobox):

Agios Dimitrios (4)
Alimos (7)
Elliniko-Argyroupoli (14)
Glyfada (12)
Kallithea (20)
Moschato-Tavros (24)
Nea Smyrni (26)
Palaio Faliro (27)

See also
List of settlements in Attica

References

 
Regional units of Attica
2011 establishments in Greece